The men's multiplier accuracy competition in casting at the 2001 World Games took place from 22 to 24 August 2001 at the Akita Prefectural Central Park in Akita, Japan.

Competition format
A total of 30 athletes entered the competition. Best nine athletes from preliminary round qualifies to the semifinal. From semifinal the best three athletes advances to the final.

Results

Preliminary

Semifinal

Final

References

External links
 Results on IWGA website

Casting at the 2001 World Games